Sarayut Sompim (born 23 March 1997) is a Thai professional footballer who plays as a defender for Thai League 2 club Nakhon Si United.

International goals

Under-23

Honours

International

Thailand U-19
 AFF U-19 Youth Championship 
  Winners (1) : 2015

Thailand U-23
 2019 AFF U-22 Youth Championship: Runner up

References

1997 births
Living people
Sarayut Sompim
Sarayut Sompim
Association football defenders
Sarayut Sompim
Sarayut Sompim
Sarayut Sompim
Sarayut Sompim
Sarayut Sompim
Sarayut Sompim
Sarayut Sompim
Sarayut Sompim
Competitors at the 2019 Southeast Asian Games
Sarayut Sompim
Nakhon Si United F.C. players